Beşpınar is a village in the Beşiri District of Batman Province in Turkey. The village is populated by Kurds of non-tribal affiliation and had a population of 1,756 in 2021. The village is populated by Yazidis.

The hamlets of Doruklu and Sütlüce are attached to the village. Doruklu is also populated by Yazidis.

References 

Villages in Beşiri District
Kurdish settlements in Batman Province
Yazidi villages in Turkey